Marcel Toussaint Louis Joseph Terfve was a Belgian corporal of World War I. He was known as the last Belgian soldier to be killed in the war, dying at 10:45 a.m, a quarter of an hour before the Armistice of 11 November 1918 took effect.

Biography
Marcel Terfve was born in Liège on December 2, 1893. His father, Gilles, was an aspiring notary and his mother, French, Marie-Jeanne Drapier, was unemployed. Single, Terfve was an insurance inspector before the start of World War I. In 1914, he volunteered and was enlisted in the  within the 3rd company. Within the 1st Line Regiment, he was stationed upon the defenses at the Gete at the Battle of the Yser on October 1914. After the fall of Diksmuide, Terfve spent the next 3 years within the trenches.

Terfve then traveled to France to study to become a non-commissioned officer and graduated as a warrant officer and he initially wanted to become a second lieutenant but he asked for his demotion to remain a corporal within his unit. On November 11, 1918, the first regiment joined the left bank of the Ghent–Terneuzen Canal within the vicinity of Kluizen. At 6:40 a.m., the 1st Line Regiment received a notice from the high command informing that a ceasefire would take place at 11 a.m. This message is confirmed at 9:08. An officer notes, however, the German forces retained their machine guns on the right bank of the canal. At 10:42 a.m., three soldiers were mowed down by machine gun fire on the edge of the canal. Two were seriously injured and Terfve himself received a bullet which punctured his left lung. Despite the regiment's best efforts to mend his wound, at 10.45 am, Terfve passed away, a quarter of an hour before the Armistice of 11 November 1918 went into effect.

Legacy
Terfve was first buried in Eeklo. He was then re-interred thereafter in the cemetery of Mons-lez-Liège on May 31, 1921.

There is currently no monument in memory of Terfve as there is for Antoine Fonck, the first Belgian soldier to die on August 4, 1914. His burial also seems not to have been preserved.

See also
Antoine Fonck, the first Belgian Land Component soldier killed, 1914
Jules Andre Peugeot, the first French Army soldier killed, 1914
John Parr, the first British Army soldier killed, 1914
Thomas Enright, one of the first three American Army soldiers killed, 1917
Merle Hay, one of the first three American Army soldiers killed, 1917
James Bethel Gresham, one of the first three American Army soldiers killed, 1917
George Edwin Ellison, the last British soldier killed in World War I, at 9:30 a.m. 11 November
George Lawrence Price, the last Canadian soldier killed in World War I, 10:58 a.m. 11 November.
 Augustin Trébuchon, the last French soldier killed in World War I, 
 Henry Gunther, the last soldier killed in World War I,

References

1893 births
1918 deaths
Belgian Army personnel of World War I
Belgian military personnel killed in World War I
Military personnel from Liège
Belgian Army soldiers